Rosemary is an American radio soap opera broadcast on NBC Radio from October 2, 1944 to March 23, 1945, and on CBS Radio from March 26, 1945 to July 1, 1955. Starring Betty Winkler as Rosemary Dawson Roberts, the program's only sponsor was Procter & Gamble, primarily for Ivory Snow dishwashing liquid, Camay soap, Dash and Tide laundry detergents and Prell shampoo. The series was created by Elaine Carrington, who had previously created Pepper Young's Family (1932-1959) and When a Girl Marries (1939-1957).

Characters and story
When the program began, it focused on 20-year-old secretary Rosemary Dawson (Winkler), who supports her mother (Marion Barney) and younger sister Patti (Jone Allison). Rosemary marries journalist Bill Roberts (George Keane), a war veteran and amnesiac who later remembers his first wife Audrey (Allison) and daughter Jessica (Joan Lazer) but forgets his present with Rosemary. The show also included Rosemary's best friend Joyce Miller (Mary Jane Higby), lawyer Peter Harvey (Lawson Zerbe), and Dr. Jim Cotter (Bill Adams).

Cast
Winkler and Keane met doing Rosemary and married. When Keane was forced to leave the program due to illness, Winkler left as well, and they were replaced by Robert Readick and Virginia Kaye in the roles. Most of the other characters were also portrayed by multiple actors, including Patsy Campbell as Patti; Lesley Woods and Joan Alexander as Audrey; Helen Choate as Joyce; Sydney Smith as Peter and Charles Penman as Jim.

Rosemary was complimented for its "realistic approach to life" despite its use of plot devices like amnesia, and the program got "generally higher marks" from critics than its competition.

References

Listen to

External links
"Rosemary", in Radio Best magazine's October 1949 issue

1944 radio programme debuts
1955 radio programme endings
1940s American radio programs
1950s American radio programs
American radio soap operas
CBS Radio programs
NBC radio programs